The Seattle Mariners' 2000 season was the franchise's 24th, and ended in the American League Championship Series, falling to the New York Yankees in six games.

The regular season ended with the Mariners finishing 2nd in the American League West but earning the franchise's first wild card berth, with a  record. In the playoffs, they swept the Chicago White Sox in the American League Division Series, then were defeated by the New York Yankees.

Offseason
 November 17, 1999: Rich Butler was signed as a free agent by the Mariners.
 December 15, 1999: John Olerud was signed as a free agent by the Mariners.
 January 14, 2000: Brian Lesher was signed as a free agent by the Mariners.
 January 19, 2000: Joe Oliver was signed as a free agent by the Mariners.
 February 10, 2000: Ken Griffey Jr. was traded by the Mariners to the Cincinnati Reds for Mike Cameron, Brett Tomko, Antonio Pérez, and Jake Meyer (minors).

Regular season

Season standings

Record vs. opponents

Notable transactions
 May 19, 2000: Rickey Henderson was signed as a free agent by the Seattle Mariners.
 July 9, 2000: Wladimir Balentien was signed as an amateur free agent by the Mariners.
 July 31, 2000: John Mabry and Tom Davey were traded by the Mariners to the San Diego Padres for Al Martin.
 September 28, 2000: Termel Sledge was sent by the Seattle Mariners to the Montreal Expos to complete an earlier deal made on August 8, 2000. The Seattle Mariners sent players to be named later to the Montreal Expos for players to be named later and Chris Widger. The Seattle Mariners sent Sean Spencer (August 10, 2000) and Terrmel Sledge (September 28, 2000) to the Montreal Expos to complete the trade.

Roster

Player stats

Batting

Starters by position
Note: Pos = Position; G = Games played; AB = At bats; R = Runs; H = Hits;  HR = Home runs; RBI = Runs batted in; Avg. = Batting average; SB = Stolen bases

Other batters
Note: G = Games played; AB = At bats; R = Runs; H = Hits; HR = Home runs; RBI = Runs batted in; Avg. = Batting average; SB = Stolen bases

Pitching

Starting pitchers
Note: G = Games pitched; IP = Innings pitched; W = Wins; L = Losses; ERA = Earned run average; SO = Strikeouts

Other pitchers
Note: G = Games pitched; IP = Innings pitched; W = Wins; L = Losses; ERA = Earned run average; SO = Strikeouts

Relief pitchers
Note: G = Games pitched; W = Wins; L = Losses; SV = Saves; ERA = Earned run average; SO = Strikeouts

ALDS

Seattle wins the series, 3-0

ALCS

Seattle Mariners vs. New York Yankees
Yankees win the Series, 4-2

Farm system

Major League Baseball Draft 

The following is a list of 2000 Seattle Mariners draft picks. The Mariners took part in the June regular draft, also known as the Rule 4 draft. The Mariners made 47 selections in the 2000 draft, the first being pitcher Sam Hays in the fourth round. In all, the Mariners selected 21 pitchers, 13 outfielders, 6 catchers, 5 shortstops, and 2 third basemen.

Draft

Key

Table

References

External links
2000 Seattle Mariners at Baseball Reference
2000 Seattle Mariners team page at www.baseball-almanac.com

Seattle Mariners seasons
2000 in sports in Washington (state)
Seattle Mariners season